Deokgasan (Chungcheongbuk-do) is a mountain of Chungcheongbuk-do, South Korea. It has an altitude of 858 metres

See also
List of mountains of Korea

References

Mountains of North Chungcheong Province
Goesan County
Mountains of South Korea